"I Was Brought to My Senses" is a song by English musician Sting. It appears on his fifth studio album Mercury Falling and was released as the album's third single on 2 September 1996.

Background

"I Was Brought to My Senses" is a song about gaining a greater appreciation for nature. The song starts in a folk-ballad style before transitioning to a full band performance with what Sting called "a Brazilian vibe".

Upon its release as a single, "I Was Brought to My Senses" peaked at number 31 in the UK. Unlike the other three singles released from Mercury Falling, the song failed to chart in the US. In contrast with previous singles which primarily consisted of remixes, the single release included the non-album tracks "This Was Never Meant to Be" and The Pirate's Bride".

Track listing

All tracks written by Sting.

CD maxi-single

 "I Was Brought to My Senses" (Steve Lipson Remix) – 4:43
 "This Was Never Meant to Be" – 3:08
 "The Pirate's Bride" – 5:00
 "I Was Brought to My Senses" – 5:49

"Mini-greatest hits" maxi-single

 "I Was Brought to My Senses" (Steve Lipson Remix) – 4:43
 "When We Dance" – 5:55
 "If I Ever Lose My Faith in You" – 4:30
 "If You Love Somebody Set Them Free" – 4:14

Charts

References

1996 songs
1996 singles
Sting (musician) songs
Songs written by Sting (musician)